Paratylenchus is a genus of nematodes (round worms). Many of the species in this genus are plant pathogens.

References 

Tylenchida
Secernentea genera